This is a list of Spanish regents, a regent, from the Latin regens "one who reigns", is a person selected to act as head of state (ruling or not) because the ruler is a minor, not present, or debilitated.

Reign of Joanna, Queen of Castile and Aragon

Reign of Charles I

Reign of Philip III

Reign of Charles II

Reign of Philip V

Reign of Charles III

First Reign of Ferdinand VII

French Invasion and Reign of Joseph Bonaparte

Second Reign of Ferdinand VII

Peninsular War

Liberal Triennium and Hundred Thousand Sons of St. Louis Intervention

Reign of Isabella II

Interregnum and Reign of Amadeo

Reign of Alfonso XII

Reign of Alfonso XIII

Francoism

Acting regents

See also
Regency
List of regents
List of heads of state of Spain
List of Spanish monarchs
President of Spain
Royal Consorts of Spain
Prime Minister of Spain
Spanish monarchy
Kings of Spain family tree

Notes

References 

Spain
Spain
Heads of state of Spain
Regents
Regents
Regents